The Navy of the Dominican Republic, is one of the three branches of the Armed Forces of the Dominican Republic, together with the Army and the Air Force.

History

After the Dominican Republic gained its independence from Haiti on February 27, 1844, there was a need to create a naval fleet. Three schooners were commissioned for this,  (flagship), María Chica and Leonor. These were the original three Dominican vessels which were incorporated in the newly created Dominican Navy as authorized by the Junta Central Gubernativa with the Naval Act of 1844 on April 23, 1844, the same day the Navy was created. Even though, the three schooners had been in action since April 15 at the Battle of Tortuguero, where they were led by Admiral Juan Bautista Cambiaso and sank six Haitian ships.

During the Dominican Civil War, a part of the Navy opposed the "Return to the Legitime Government" which was victim of a coup d'état in September 1963 and used the frigate  to bombard the National Palace with the help of the Air Force.

On the other side of the conflict, The elite navy force "Hombres Ranas" (Frog Men) under Commander Ramon Montes Arache, fought to bring the 1962 democratically elected president back in office. The other navy commanders were afraid of the "Hombres Ranas" taking control over Las Calderas Naval Base. See United States occupation of the Dominican Republic (1965–1966)

Naval bases
The Navy maintains several naval stations and detachments, but has three main bases:

 Base Naval 27 de Febrero, located in the city of Santo Domingo, the Chief of Staff and the Naval Academy "Vice-Admiral Cesar de Windt Lavandier".
 Base Naval de Las Calderas, located in Peravia Province, is the largest naval base. The Bahia Las Calderas Naval Shipyard (ANABALCA) is located here. This shipyard is responsible for the maintenance of naval units of the fleet, as well as civilian vessels.  Military and civilian vessels, such as tugs, boats, barges, pilot boats have also been built at this site.
 Base Naval Boca Chica, located in Boca Chica, 35 km east of Santo Domingo.

List of current vessels

Ranks

Commissioned officer ranks
The rank insignia of commissioned officers.

Other ranks
The rank insignia of non-commissioned officers and enlisted personnel.

Dominican Naval Auxiliary Corps
The Dominican Naval Auxiliary Corps is a civilian force that possesses its own resources to assist in search operations, rescue and environmental protection. This organization was created by the Executive by Decree 887-09 and it is composed of a group of business and professional volunteers.

The organization operates private boats, barges and aircraft made available to the Navy, in order to assist with non-military activities or public order and safety at sea. The Dominican Naval Auxiliary has a presence in the north, northeast, east, south and center of the country.

Naval Commandos
The Naval Commandos are the Special Operations component of the Dominican Navy and are only employed in emergency situations. The Naval Commandos are capable of undertaking unconventional warfare, hostage rescue, counter-terrorism, VBSS (Visit Board Search and Seizure) and are experts in handling explosives and amphibious operations. They are also trained in parachuting, hand-to-hand combat, CQC and other key skills. The team's armament includes the M16 rifle with the M203 grenade launcher, the Colt M4A1, M14 rifle, Mossberg 500 shotgun, the M60 machine gun and small arms. The team operates inflated zodiac boats, RHIBs, and night vision goggles, among other equipment.

Some team members saw action during Operation Iraqi Freedom. Dominican troops, comprising a battalion of special components of the Dominican Armed forces, were under constant mortar attacks but suffered no casualties. While in Iraq, the troops were serving in the Plus Ultra Brigade, which was under Spanish command and operating in Southern Iraq.

Marine Infantry Command 
Raised in 2008 the MIC serves as the youngest arm of service in the Dominican Navy, which is tasked for amphibious and landing operations. One Marine Battalion is of active service as of the present. It also the youngest Marine unit in all of Latin America.

See also
Military of the Dominican Republic

References

External links
 Marina de Guerra Dominicana 

 
Navy
Military units and formations established in 1844